The 2009–10 New Jersey Nets season was the 43rd season of the franchise, 34th in the National Basketball Association (NBA). This was the team's final season at the Izod Center. On February 6, the Nets lost to the Detroit Pistons, falling to 4–46 and tying the record for the worst 50-game record in the history of the three major sports (NBA, MLB, NHL) that play seasons that long.

Key dates 
 June 25 – The 2009 NBA draft took place in New York City.
 July 8 – The free agency period started.
 November 29 – Lawrence Frank was relieved of his duties as head coach after the team began the season with 16 consecutive losses, one shy of the NBA record. This streak was ongoing at the time of his dismissal. Tom Barrise, who previously served as assistant coach under Frank, became his replacement as interim head coach for the Nets' game that night against the Los Angeles Lakers, which the Nets lost 106–87 for their record-tying 17th consecutive loss. After a two-game stint by Barrise, general manager Kiki Vandeweghe was named the head coach for the remainder of the season, and Del Harris was given a position as assistant coach.
 December 4 – New Jersey Nets defeated the Charlotte Bobcats to break 18-game losing streak.

Summary

NBA Draft 2009

Free agency

Draft picks

Roster

Pre-season

Regular season

Standings

Record vs. opponents

Game log 

|- bgcolor="#ffcccc"
| 1
| October 28
| @Minnesota
| 
| Brook Lopez (27)
| Brook Lopez (15)
| Devin Harris (8)
| Target Center18,358
| 0-1
|- bgcolor="#ffcccc"
| 2
| October 30
| Orlando
| 
| Courtney Lee (18)
| Josh Boone (8)
| Devin Harris (7)
| Izod Center17,525
| 0-2
|- bgcolor="#ffcccc"
| 3
| October 31
| @Washington
| 
| Chris Douglas-Roberts (25)
| Yi Jianlian (7)
| Rafer Alston (8)
| Verizon Center20,173
| 0-3

|- bgcolor="#ffcccc"
| 4
| November 2
| @Charlotte
| 
| Chris Douglas-Roberts (20)
| Bobby Simmons (7)
| Rafer Alston (5)
| Time Warner Cable Arena9,380
| 0-4
|- bgcolor="#ffcccc"
| 5
| November 4
| Denver
| 
| Chris Douglas-Roberts (19)
| Brook Lopez (8)
| Rafer Alston (4)
| Izod Center15,319
| 0-5
|- bgcolor="#ffcccc"
| 6
| November 6
| @Philadelphia
| 
| Brook Lopez (22)
| Trenton Hassell (12)
| Terrence Williams (9)
| Wachovia Center10,054
| 0-6
|- bgcolor="#ffcccc"
| 7
| November 7
| Boston
| 
| Brook Lopez (23)
| Josh Boone (12)
| Rafer Alston (7)
| Izod Center16,119
| 0-7
|- bgcolor="#ffcccc"
| 8
| November 11
| Philadelphia
| 
| Brook Lopez (23)
| Brook Lopez (14)
| Rafer Alston (5)
| Izod Center10,714
| 0-8
|- bgcolor="#ffcccc"
| 9
| November 13
| @Orlando
| 
| Rafer Alston (17)
| Terrence Williams (12)
| Rafer Alston (10)
| Amway Arena17,461
| 0-9
|- bgcolor="#ffcccc"
| 10
| November 14
| @Miami
| 
| Hassell & Lopez (17)
| Brook Lopez (9)
| Rafer Alston (3)
| American Airlines Arena17,124
| 0-10
|- bgcolor="#ffcccc"
| 11
| November 17
| Indiana
| 
| Chris Douglas-Roberts (27)
| Brook Lopez (16)
| Rafer Alston (4)
| Izod Center11,332
| 0-11
|- bgcolor="#ffcccc"
| 12
| November 18
| @Milwaukee
| 
| Chris Douglas-Roberts (31)
| Douglas-Roberts & Williams (10)
| Bobby Simmons (4)
| Bradley Center13,479
| 0-12
|- bgcolor="#ffcccc"
| 13
| November 21
| New York
| 
| Chris Douglas-Roberts (24)
| Brook Lopez (12)
| Devin Harris (7)
| Izod Center14,050
| 0-13
|- bgcolor="#ffcccc"
| 14
| November 24
| @Denver
| 
| Alston & Harris (19)
| Josh Boone (12)
| Devin Harris (6)
| Pepsi Center16,307
| 0-14
|- bgcolor="#ffcccc"
| 15
| November 25
| @Portland
| 
| Brook Lopez (32)
| Brook Lopez (14)
| Rafer Alston (6)
| Rose Garden Arena20,322
| 0-15
|- bgcolor="#ffcccc"
| 16
| November 27
| @Sacramento
| 
| Devin Harris (25)
| Brook Lopez (11)
| Alston & Devin Harris (3)
| ARCO Arena12,725
| 0-16
|- bgcolor="#ffcccc"
| 17
| November 29
| @LA Lakers
| 
| Brook Lopez (26)
| Brook Lopez (12)
| Devin Harris (6)
| Staples Center18,997
| 0-17

|- bgcolor="#ffcccc"
| 18
| December 2
| Dallas
| 
| Chris Douglas-Roberts (24)
| Lee & Lopez (6)
| Terrence Williams (6)
| Izod Center11,689
| 0-18
|- bgcolor="#bbffbb"
| 19
| December 4
| Charlotte
| 
| Brook Lopez (31)
| Brook Lopez (14)
| Devin Harris (8)
| Izod Center12,131
| 1-18
|- bgcolor="#ffcccc"
| 20
| December 6
| @New York
| 
| Chris Douglas-Roberts (26)
| Josh Boone (7)
| Devin Harris (6)
| Madison Square Garden19,602
| 1-19
|- bgcolor="#bbffbb"
| 21
| December 8
| @Chicago
| 
| Brook Lopez (25)
| Boone & Lopez (10)
| Devin Harris (6)
| United Center17,872
| 2-19
|- bgcolor="#ffcccc"
| 22
| December 9
| Golden State
| 
| Brook Lopez (21)
| Brook Lopez (10)
| Courtney Lee (3)
| Izod Center10,005
| 2-20
|- bgcolor="#ffcccc"
| 23
| December 11
| @Indiana
| 
| Brook Lopez (25)
| Brook Lopez (14)
| Alston & Harris (3)
| Conseco Fieldhouse12,175
| 2-21
|- bgcolor="#ffcccc"
| 24
| December 13
| @Atlanta
| 
| Devin Harris (23)
| Brook Lopez (12)
| Devin Harris (9)
| Philips Arena14,015
| 2-22
|- bgcolor="#ffcccc"
| 25
| December 15
| @Cleveland
| 
| Lopez & Harris (22)
| Brook Lopez (15)
| Alston & Harris (3)
| Quicken Loans Arena20,562
| 2-23
|- bgcolor="#ffcccc"
| 26
| December 16
| Utah
| 
| Brook Lopez (23)
| Josh Boone (11)
| Devin Harris (6)
| Izod Center11,476
| 2-24
|- bgcolor="#ffcccc"
| 27
| December 18
| @Toronto
| 
| Chris Douglas-Roberts (16)
| Brook Lopez (8)
| Three players (4)
| Air Canada Centre15,901
| 2-25
|- bgcolor="#ffcccc"
| 28
| December 19
| LA Lakers
| 
| Devin Harris (21)
| Brook Lopez (11)
| Brook Lopez (4)
| Izod Center17,190
| 2-26
|- bgcolor="#ffcccc"
| 29
| December 23
| Minnesota
| 
| Devin Harris (23)
| Brook Lopez (10)
| Devin Harris (8)
| Izod Center10,204
| 2-27
|- bgcolor="#ffcccc"
| 30
| December 26
| Houston
| 
| Devin Harris (19)
| Brook Lopez (11)
| Keyon Dooling & Harris (6)
| Izod Center13,374
| 2-28
|- bgcolor="#ffcccc"
| 31
| December 28
| Oklahoma City
| 
| Yi Jianlian (29)
| Jianlian & Lopez (7)
| Devin Harris (11)
| Izod Center15,335
| 2-29
|- bgcolor="#bbffbb"
| 32
| December 30
| New York
| 
| Yi Jianlian (22)
| Brook Lopez (14)
| Devin Harris (8)
| Izod Center17,575
| 3-29

|- bgcolor="#ffcccc"
| 33
| January 2
| Cleveland
| 
| Devin Harris (22)
| Yi Jianlian (8)
| Devin Harris (6)
| Izod Center17,569
| 3-30
|- bgcolor="#ffcccc"
| 34
| January 5
| Milwaukee
| 
| Yi Jianlian (22)
| Brook Lopez (7)
| Devin Harris (7)
| Izod Center11,101
| 3-31
|- bgcolor="#ffcccc"
| 35
| January 6
| @Atlanta
| 
| Yi Jianlian (19)
| Yi Jianlian (11)
| Devin Harris (8)
| Philips Arena11,219
| 3-32
|- bgcolor="#ffcccc"
| 36
| January 8
| @New Orleans
| 
| Courtney Lee (28)
| Yi Jianlian (10)
| Courtney Lee (6)
| New Orleans Arena15,555
| 3-33
|- bgcolor="#ffcccc"
| 37
| January 10
| @San Antonio
| 
| Brook Lopez (28)
| Brook Lopez (11)
| Dooling & Lee (5)
| AT&T Center18,047
| 3-34
|- bgcolor="#ffcccc"
| 38
| January 13
| Boston
| 
| Yi Jianlian (19)
| Brook Lopez (10)
| Devin Harris (6)
| Izod Center14,112
| 3-35
|- bgcolor="#ffcccc"
| 39
| January 15
| Indiana
| 
| Brook Lopez (27)
| Yi Jianlian (10)
| Devin Harris (9)
| Izod Center13,656
| 3-36
|- bgcolor="#ffcccc"
| 40
| January 18
| @LA Clippers
| 
| Brook Lopez (23)
| Brook Lopez (8)
| Devin Harris (8)
| Staples Center14,533
| 3-37
|- bgcolor="#ffcccc"
| 41
| January 20
| @Phoenix
| 
| Brook Lopez (26)
| Brook Lopez (13)
| Devin Harris (7)
| US Airways Center15,963
| 3-38
|- bgcolor="#ffcccc"
| 42
| January 22
| @Golden State
| 
| Brook Lopez (21)
| Yi Jianlian (11)
| Terrence Williams (4)
| Oracle Arena17,308
| 3-39
|- bgcolor="#ffcccc"
| 43
| January 23
| @Utah
| 
| Yi Jianlian (16)
| Terrence Williams (6)
| Four players (3)
| EnergySolutions Arena19,911
| 3-40
|- bgcolor="#bbffbb"
| 44
| January 27
| LA Clippers
| 
| Kris Humphries (25)
| Brook Lopez, Terrence Williams (9)
| Keyon Dooling, Terrence Williams (8)
| Izod Center9,220
| 4-40
|- bgcolor="#ffcccc"
| 45
| January 29
| Washington
| 
| Courtney Lee (19)
| Chris Douglas-Roberts (9)
| Keyon Dooling (6)
| Izod Center11,384
| 4-41
|- bgcolor="#ffcccc"
| 46
| January 31
| Philadelphia
| 
| Jarvis Hayes, Brook Lopez (18)
| Yi Jianlian (12)
| Keyon Dooling (7)
| Izod Center11,576
| 4-42

|- bgcolor="#ffcccc"
| 47
| February 2
| Detroit
| 
| Brook Lopez (27)
| Kris Humphries (12)
| Devin Harris (14)
| Izod Center9,417
| 4-43
|- bgcolor="#ffcccc"
| 48
| February 3
| @Toronto
| 
| Devin Harris, Yi Jianlian (15)
| Kris Humphries (11)
| Devin Harris (8)
| Air Canada Centre15,222
| 4-44
|- bgcolor="#ffcccc"
| 49
| February 5
| @Boston
| 
| Brook Lopez (19)
| Kris Humphries (8)
| Devin Harris (8)
| TD Garden18,624
| 4-45
|- bgcolor="#ffcccc"
| 50
| February 6
| @Detroit
| 
| Devin Harris (21)
| Kris Humphries (9)
| Devin Harris (7)
| The Palace of Auburn Hills20,176
| 4-46
|- bgcolor="#ffcccc"
| 51
| February 9
| @Cleveland
| 
| Courtney Lee (24)
| Brook Lopez (14)
| Keyon Dooling (7)
| Quicken Loans Arena20,562
| 4-47
|- bgcolor="#ffcccc"
| 52
| February 10
| Milwaukee
| 
| Devin Harris (27)
| Yi Jianlian (14)
| Devin Harris (9)
| Izod Center12,873
| 4-48
|- bgcolor="#bbffbb"
| 53
| February 16
| @Charlotte
| 
| Courtney Lee (21)
| Kris Humphries, Josh Boone (8)
| Devin Harris (9)
| Time Warner Cable Arena13,712
| 5-48
|- bgcolor="#ffcccc"
| 54
| February 17
| Miami
| 
| Brook Lopez (26)
| Kris Humphries (12)
| Devin Harris (6)
| Izod Center12,251
| 5-49
|- bgcolor="#ffcccc"
| 55
| February 19
| Toronto
| 
| Brook Lopez (22)
| Brook Lopez (8)
| Devin Harris (11)
| Izod Center11,994
| 5-50
|- bgcolor="#ffcccc"
| 56
| February 21
| Memphis
| 
| Brook Lopez (26)
| Brook Lopez, Josh Boone (9)
| Devin Harris (13)
| Izod Center12,076
| 5-51
|- bgcolor="#ffcccc"
| 57
| February 23
| Portland
| 
| Devin Harris, Courtney Lee (28)
| Brook Lopez (10)
| Devin Harris (5)
| Izod Center11,138
| 5-52
|- bgcolor="#bbffbb"
| 58
| February 27
| @Boston
| 
| Brook Lopez (25)
| Kris Humphries, Yi Jianlian (10)
| Devin Harris (5)
| TD Garden18,624
| 6-52
|- bgcolor="#ffcccc"
| 59
| February 28
| Washington
| 
| Yi Jianlian (20)
| Yi Jianlian (19)
| Devin Harris (14)
| Izod Center11,844
| 6-53

|- bgcolor="#ffcccc"
| 60
| March 3
| Cleveland
| 
| Terrence Williams, Brook Lopez (21)
| Brook Lopez (14)
| Terrence Williams (7)
| Izod Center17,502
| 6-54
|- bgcolor="#ffcccc"
| 61
| March 5
| Magic
| 
| Brook Lopez (18)
| Brook Lopez (8)
| Devin Harris (10)
| Izod Center15,320
| 6-55
|- bgcolor="#bbffbb"
| 62
| March 6
| @New York
| 
| Devin Harris (31)
| Brook Lopez, Terrence Williams (11)
| Terrence Williams (7)
| Madison Square Garden19,763
| 7-55
|- bgcolor="#ffcccc"
| 63
| March 8
| @Memphis
| 
| Courtney Lee (30)
| Josh Boone (9)
| Terrence Williams, Brook Lopez (6)
| FedExForum
| 7-56
|- bgcolor="#ffcccc"
| 64
| March 10
| @Dallas
| 
| Devin Harris (21)
| Terrence Williams (13)
| Devin Harris (7)
| American Airlines Center
| 7-57
|- bgcolor="#ffcccc"
| 65
| March 12
| @Oklahoma City
| 
| Devin Harris (19)
| Brook Lopez, Josh Boone (8)
| Devin Harris (8)
| Ford Center
| 7-58
|- bgcolor="#ffcccc"
| 66
| March 13
| @Houston
| 
| Courtney Lee (24)
| Brook Lopez (10)
| Devin Harris (7)
| Toyota Center
| 7-59
|- bgcolor="#ffcccc"
| 67
| March 16
| Atlanta
| 
| Brook Lopez (21)
| Josh Boone (20)
| Keyon Dooling (6)
| Izod Center
| 7-60
|- bgcolor="#ffcccc"
| 68
| March 17
| @Philadelphia
| 
| Chris Douglas-Roberts (23)
| Josh Boone (8)
| Terrence Williams, Keyon Dooling (3)
| Wachovia Center
| 7-61
|- bgcolor="#ffcccc"
| 69
| March 20
| Toronto
| 
| Devin Harris (22)
| Brook Lopez (13)
| Devin Harris (7)
| Izod Center
| 7-62
|- bgcolor="#ffcccc"
| 70
| March 22
| Miami
| 
| Brook Lopez (26)
| Kris Humphries (9)
| Terrence Williams (7)
| Izod Center
| 7-63
|- bgcolor="#bbffbb"
| 71
| March 24
| Sacramento
| 
| Brook Lopez (26)
| Brook Lopez (13)
| Devin Harris (9)
| Izod Center
| 8-63
|- bgcolor="#bbffbb"
| 72
| March 26
| Detroit
| 
| Brook Lopez (37)
| Brook Lopez (10)
| Devin Harris (12)
| Izod Center
| 9-63
|- bgcolor="#ffcccc"
| 73
| March 27
| @Chicago
| 
| Terrence Williams (16)
| Kris Humphries, Yi Jianlian (8)
| Devin Harris (9)
| United Center
| 9-64
|- bgcolor="#bbffbb"
| 74
| March 29
| San Antonio
| 
| Brook Lopez (22)
| Brook Lopez (12)
| Devin Harris (9)
| Izod Center
| 10-64
|- bgcolor="#ffcccc"
| 75
| March 31
| Phoenix
| 
| Terrence Williams (21)
| Brook Lopez (8)
| Terrence Williams, Devin Harris (9)
| Izod Center
| 10-65

|- bgcolor="#bbffbb"
| 76
| April 3
| New Orleans
| 
| Chris Douglas-Roberts (17)
| Kris Humphries (12)
| Terrence Williams (14)
| Izod Center
| 11-65
|- bgcolor="#ffcccc"
| 77
| April 4
| @Washington
| 
| Devin Harris, Brook Lopez (22)
| Yi Jianlian, Kris Humphries (7)
| Brook Lopez, Terrence Williams (4)
| Verizon Center
| 11-66
|- bgcolor="#ffcccc"
| 78
| April 7
| @Milwaukee
| 
| Devin Harris (25)
| Yi Jianlian (8)
| Brook Lopez (7)
| Bradley Center
| 11-67
|- bgcolor="#bbffbb"
| 79
| April 9
| Chicago
| 
| Terrence Williams (27)
| Brook Lopez (14)
| Terrence Williams (10)
| Izod Center
| 12-67
|- bgcolor="#ffcccc"
| 80
| April 10
| @Indiana
| 
| Brook Lopez (20)
| Terrence Williams (8)
| Terrence Williams (7)
| Conseco Fieldhouse
| 12-68
|- bgcolor="#ffcccc"
| 81
| April 12
| Charlotte
| 
| Devin Harris (22)
| Terrence Williams (13)
| Terrence Williams (6)
| Izod Center
| 12-69
|- bgcolor="#ffcccc"
| 82
| April 14
| @Miami
| 
| Yi Jianlian (23)
| Yi Jianlian (15)
| Devin Harris, Terrence Williams (3)
| AmericanAirlines Arena
| 12-70

Player statistics

Regular season 

|-
| 
| 15 || 0 || 8.9 || .350 || .250 || .700 || 1.5 || .2 || .3 || .1 || 2.4
|-
| 
| 63 || 28 || 16.6 || style=";"|.525 || .000 || .328 || 5.0 || .5 || .5 || .8 || 4.0
|-
| 
| 53 || 8 || 18.3 || .398 || style=";"|.376 || .770 || 1.0 || 2.5 || .6 || .0 || 6.9
|-
| 
| 67 || 38 || 25.8 || .445 || .259 || .847 || 3.0 || 1.4 || .8 || .3 || 9.8
|-
| 
| 64 || 61 || 34.7 || .403 || .276 || .798 || 3.2 || style=";"|6.6 || 1.2 || .3 || 16.9
|-
| 
| 52 || 31 || 21.3 || .411 || .000 || .754 || 2.9 || 1.0 || .3 || .2 || 4.5
|-
| 
| 45 || 9 || 23.0 || .421 || .335 || .778 || 2.4 || .9 || .6 || .2 || 7.8
|-
| 
| 44 || 0 || 20.6 || .433 || .000 || .699 || 6.4 || .6 || .7 || .8 || 8.1
|-
| 
| 71 || 66 || 33.5 || .436 || .338 || .869 || 3.5 || 1.7 || style=";"|1.3 || .3 || 12.5
|-
| 
| style=";"|82 || style=";"|82 || style=";"|36.9 || .499 || .000 || .817 || style=";"|8.6 || 2.3 || .7 || style=";"|1.7 || style=";"|18.8
|-
| 
| 25 || 0 || 8.9 || .357 || .313 || style=";"|1.000 || .6 || 1.2 || .4 || .0 || 2.2
|-
| 
| 23 || 2 || 17.2 || .359 || .317 || .900 || 2.7 || .7 || .6 || .1 || 5.3
|-
| 
| 78 || 9 || 22.6 || .401 || .310 || .715 || 4.5 || 2.9 || .6 || .1 || 8.4
|-
| 
| 52 || 51|| 31.8 || .403 || .366 || .798 || 7.2 || .9 || .7 || 1.0 || 12.0
|}

Awards, records and milestones

Awards

Week or month

All-Star 
NONE

Season

Records

NBA 
 Worst winless start of season in NBA history (0–18)
 Worst 30-game start in NBA history (2–28)
 The 1970–71 Cleveland Cavaliers, 1992–93 Dallas Mavericks, 1993–94 Dallas Mavericks, 1997–98 Denver Nuggets, and 2004–05 New Orleans Hornets also started 2–28.
 Worst 3-win start in NBA history (3–40)
 The 1993–94 Dallas Mavericks and 1997–98 Denver Nuggets also started 3–40.
 Worst 50-game start in sports history (4–46)
 The 1972–73 Philadelphia 76ers and 1992–93 Dallas Mavericks also started 4–46.

Franchise 
 Most points allowed in any one quarter (49; second quarter) – December 2, 2009 vs. Dallas Mavericks

Milestones 
 Terrence Williams recorded his first career triple-double in a win over the Chicago Bulls

Injuries and surgeries 
Devin Harris missed 10 games at the beginning of November due to a groin strain before returning on November 21 against the New York Knicks.

In addition, at one point the entire starting lineup, with the exception of center Brook Lopez, was injured. For a considerable portion of the season the Nets were forced to play extremely short-handed, and multiple times were able to dress only the league-minimum seven players.

Transactions

References

External links 
 2009–10 New Jersey Nets season at ESPN
 2009–10 New Jersey Nets season at Basketball Reference

New Jersey Nets season
New Jersey Nets seasons
New Jersey Nets
New Jersey Nets
21st century in East Rutherford, New Jersey
Meadowlands Sports Complex